James 2 is the second chapter of the Epistle of James in the New Testament of the Christian Bible. The author identifies himself as "James, a servant of God and of the Lord Jesus Christ" and the epistle is traditionally attributed to James the brother of Jesus, written in Jerusalem between 48 and 61 CE. Alternatively, some scholars argue that it is a pseudographical work written after 61 CE. This chapter contains an exposition about the commandment, "You shall love your neighbour as yourself", and about dead faith.

Text
The original text was written in Koine Greek. This chapter is divided into 26 verses.

Textual witnesses
Some early manuscripts containing the text of this chapter in Greek are:
Papyrus 20 (early 3rd century; extant verses 19–26)
Codex Vaticanus (325-350)
Codex Sinaiticus (330-360)
Codex Alexandrinus (400-440)
Codex Ephraemi Rescriptus (c. 450)
Papyrus 54 (5th century; extant verses 16–18, 22–26)

An ancient manuscript containing this chapter in the Coptic language is: 
Papyrus 6 (~AD 350; all verses).

No faith with favoritism (2:1–4)

Verse 1
 My brethren, do not hold the faith of our Lord Jesus Christ, the Lord of glory, with partiality.
"Lord of glory": closely parallels  (kyrios tēs doxes), could be an allusion to the transfiguration of Jesus (cf. John 1:14).

Poor and rich (2:5–7)
The form of address in verse 5a, Listen, my beloved brethren, is found in James' speech at the Council of Jerusalem and nowhere else in the New Testament. Verse 5b recalls Jesus' blessings in the Sermon on the Mount (Matthew 5:3,5) about the poor, in contrast to the rich who 'blaspheme the excellent name that was invoked over you' (verse 7).

Love as the royal law (2:8–13)

Verse 8
If you really fulfil the royal law according to the Scripture, "You shall love your neighbor as yourself", you do well;
Jesus made "Love your neighbor" a 'foremost command'. Because of its pre-eminence and because it is sanctioned by Jesus, the king of all that exists, James regards this citation as "the royal law".

Verse 9
If you show partiality, you commit sin, and are convicted by the law as transgressors.
To act against the poor is like murder, and is judged by the law as such (compare  and ).

Verse 10
 For the person who keeps all of the laws except one is as guilty as a person who has broken all of God’s laws.

Verse 11
 For He who said, "Do not commit adultery", also said, "Do not murder". Now if you do not commit adultery, but you do murder, you have become a transgressor of the law.

Faith alone without works is dead (2:14–17)

Verse 17
 Thus also faith by itself, if it does not have works, is dead.
Faith without the grace of charity is nothing, and charity is lost if one does not follow God's commandments and cooperate with grace by works. Thus, faith without charity and good works is dead. The Church has held since the time of the apostles that dead faith is not life-giving or salvific. However, Protestant teaching holds that dead fiduciary faith is sufficient for salvation.

Even the demons believe (2:18–20)

Verse 19
 You believe that there is one God. You do well. Even the demons believe—and tremble!

Verse 20
You foolish person! Must you be shown that faith that does nothing is worth nothing?

Abraham justified by faith and works (2:21–23)

Verses 21–23
 Was not Abraham our father justified by works, offering up Isaac his son upon the altar? Seest  thou, that faith did co-operate with his works; and by works faith was made perfect? And the scripture was fulfilled, saying: Abraham believed God, and it was reputed to him to justice, and he was called the friend of God. 
Abraham is justified before God by a living faith accompanied by charity and good works, and it is only by this that he is called a friend of God.

Justified by works and not by faith alone (2:24–26)

Verse 24
 You see then that a man is justified by works, and not by faith only. 
The consensus of the church fathers is that faith can only give life to, justify and save a soul if it is itself alive with charity (love) and good works. As Augustine writes, "faith itself is only rendered profitable by love, since faith without love can indeed exist, but cannot profit."

Verse 25
 Likewise, was not Rahab the harlot also justified by works when she received the messengers and sent them out another way?
	 
 "Rahab the harlot": received the Israelite spies by faith, protected them in her house and let them escape, instead of giving them up to the authority. Therefore, she and her family were saved when Jericho was destroyed.

See also
Abraham
Battle of Jericho
Faith
Jesus
Ten Commandments
Related Bible parts: Genesis 15, Exodus 20, Leviticus 19, Deuteronomy 5, Joshua 2, 1 Samuel 16, Galatians 5, Hebrews 11

References

Sources

External links
 King James Bible - Wikisource
English Translation with Parallel Latin Vulgate 
Online Bible at GospelHall.org (ESV, KJV, Darby, American Standard Version, Bible in Basic English)
Multiple bible versions at Bible Gateway (NKJV, NIV, NRSV etc.)

02